The  is a kofun burial mound located in the city of Gyōda, Saitama Prefecture, in the Kantō region of Japan. The tumulus was designated a National Historic Site in 1938 and re-designated as a Special National Historic Site of Japan in 2020 as part of the Sakitama Kofun Cluster.

Overview
The Okunoyama Kofun has a total length of 70 meters, and is thus the second smallest tumulus in the Saitama Kofun Cluster. As with the other keyhole-shaped tumuli in this cluster, the Okunoyama Kofun had a rectangular double moat; however, part of the outer moat overlaps that of the adjacent Teppōyama Kofun, which was built slightly later. It is thought to have been built in the middle of the 6th century AD, based on haniwa excavated from the inner moat in 1968. These included cylindrical, horse-shaped, equestrian statue-shaped, and shield-bearer shaped haniwa.

In an excavation of the main tumulus in 2018, it was found that the middle bank in the southwest corner protrudes partly to the outside. This is a feature which also appears in the Inariyama Kofun, Gyōda Futagoyama Kofun, and Shōgunyama Kofun in the Sakitama Kofun Group, but is rarely found in other locations. Called a "Tsukuridashi", the shield-bearer shaped haniwa were also found lined up on the southwestern corner, indicating that this location was of some especial ritual significance. Also of note was a decorated Sue ware jar, with a round-bottom and long-neck, together with three smaller jars of the same shape. These are thought to have been placed on an offering stand that was also excavated. There are very few examples of such Sue jars excavated in the Kantō region, and the fact that it was excavated from the second smallest burial mound towards the back of the cluster indicate that this tumulus had an importance greater than is reflected by its relatively small size. 

Overall length 70 meters
Posterior circular portion 43 meter diameter x 6.8 meter high
Anterior rectangular portion 47 meters wide x 7.4 meters high

See also
List of Historic Sites of Japan (Saitama)

References

External links

Gyoda city home page 
Museum of the Sakitama Ancient Burial Mounds 

Kofun
Archaeological sites in Japan
History of Saitama Prefecture
Gyōda
Historic Sites of Japan